Elmira Airport  is located  southwest of Elmira, Ontario, Canada.

CNT6 is the original Elmira, Ontario airport. It is located in the middle of Mennonite country with Old Order Mennonites, and the fields to the north and south of the airport are often plowed using horses. When expedient, the farmers contract with others who have tractors, and then the fields are plowed with tractors (e.g. spring of 2011 was very wet and so using tractors when the fields were dry allowed the crops to be planted more quickly).

For many years the Guelph Gliding and Soaring Association operated from this location but in 2008, their membership dropped off and with increased expenses, they ended the operation. A windstorm in the spring of 2008 destroyed many of their sailplanes that were tied up on the field, further hitting the assets of the club. One of the members' planes was in a trailer that was not tied down and the trailer ended up being blown over the fence into the neighboring farmer's field.

CNT6 is the home of C-GHQU, the SeaBeast, a converted Republic RC3 Seabee. As a Seabee, C-GHQU first flew in 1947. As the SeaBeast, C-GHQU first flew in May 2011.

See also
Elmira (East) Airport

References

Registered aerodromes in Ontario